The Jhapa rebellion was an attempted peasant uprising that took place in Jhapa district of Nepal in 1969. A conflict between landowners and tenants began after the land reforms program announced by then King Mahendra in 1964. The essence of this reform program was to set an upper bound for land ownership and establish tenant rights over land use, but the landowners refused to honor the documents, enraging the farmer who were the tenants. The Communist Party of Nepal (CPN) channelized the farmer disappointment into a political uprising that came to be known as the Jhapa Revolt. This revolt was inspired by Naxalbari uprising of India. Naxalbari is strategically situated at the tri-junction of Nepal, Bangladesh (the then East Pakistan) and India.

Jhapa rebellion paved way for popular political figures like K.P. Oli, C.P. Mainali, Mohan Chandra Adhikari, etc. in Nepalese politics. The government of Nepal attempted to suppress the rebellion and the large number of rebellions were arrested. Among them some of were killed by the police sending in a dense jungle, Sukhani, by making false reason of jail transfer.

References 

Peasant revolts
20th-century rebellions
Politics of Nepal
1969 in Nepal